Hotel Bristol is one of the oldest hotels in Belgrade, the capital of Serbia. Built in 1912, it is an anthological exemplar of the modern architecture in Belgrade and represents the pinnacle of the Secession architecture in the city. The building was declared a cultural monument in 1987.

Location 
The hotel is located in the neighborhood of Savamala, in the municipality of Savski Venac. The building occupies the entire block bounded by the streets of Karađorđeva, Hercegovačka, Zvornička and Hadži-Nikole Živkovića. South and southeast of the hotel are the incoming platforms of the Main Belgrade Bus Station and the Park Bristol. North of the hotel is the building of the Belgrade Cooperative.

History 
Situated near the "Small Market" (Mali pijac), predecessor of the hotel was the "Paranos khan". In the early 20th century, Savamala was being transformed from the neighborhood with the small, curvy alleys into the Belgrade's most affluent quarter, especially when it comes to the architecture. The khan was demolished and the construction of the new building lasted from 1910 to 1912. It was built as the building for the Insurance and Credit Association of the Belgrade Cooperative, owned by Luka Ćelović.

Hotel Bristol soon became the center of the fashionable life, not only of Belgrade, but of the entire Serbia and, later, Yugoslavia. Before the outbreak of the World War I, it was very popular among the guests from Austria-Hungary. Guests included the members of the Rockefeller family, Garry Kasparov, members of the British Royal family, numerous diplomats, officers, etc. The Rockefellers stayed at the hotel several times. John D. Rockefeller Jr. visited in the 1920s so as later did his son, David Rockefeller. He stayed in the apartment which is today named after him. David's son, David Jr., also stayed in the hotel in 1979. One of the most famous Serbian folk singers, Cune Gojković, started his career in Hotel Bristol.

In the 1960s, the administration of the hotel was awarded to the military, but the government remained an owner.

The façade was reconstructed in 1977 while the interior has been partially renovated in 1985-90. Since then, the hotel became known for the single room occupancy, as many members of the army which were exiled from the former Yugoslav republics after the outbreak of the Yugoslav wars, were settled in the hotel. The hotel is today owned by the Serbian Defense Ministry and operated by the ministry's "Dedinje" institution.

The park next to the hotel was originally called Nikoljski (Saint Nicholas' park after the nearby Svetonikolski Trg (Square of the Saint Nicholas), but in time, the name was gradually replaced with Park Bristol, after the hotel.

Architecture 
The hotel was projected by Nikola Nestorović and from the beginning was envisioned as the representative edifice. Apart from the hotel premises and shops on the ground floor, it was planned as the residential building, too. The only modern hotel build in Belgrade prior to Bristol was the Hotel Moskva, built in 1906. The tallest building in the city upon its construction, it highly influenced the look of the Hotel Bristol, especially when it comes to the façade. The fronts of both buildings are almost identical while the façade in the Karađorđeva street is identical to Moskva's.

The architectural characteristics of the building are highly regarded. It is qualified as an anthological exemplar of the modern architecture in Belgrade and described as the pinnacle of the Secession architecture in the city. The building was declared a cultural monument in 1987.

Characteristics 
The Hotel Bristol has 52 rooms (3 three-bed, 39 two-bed and 10 one-bed), 11 apartments (5 small, 3 large, 2 lux and the "Golden" or the "Rockefeller" apartment). There are also an aperitif bar, two national cuisine restaurants with 250 seats, beer lounge with 40 seats, "Little Salon" with 55 seats and the pastry shop. It is equipped with the Louis XVI style furniture, including the golden-framed mirror from the 18th century. It is used as the location of many music videos and photo-editorials.

Future 
According to the contract on the highly controversial project Belgrade Waterfront, foreign investor ("Eagle Hills" from the United Arab Emirates), if investing in the reconstruction of the objects in the Savamala district, can use them without any compensation. In 2017 City of Belgrade Monuments Protection Institute green-lighted the project of Bristol's reconstruction, though as of July 2018, officially there are no details about the project or the future of the building, except that it will be adapted into the "luxurious hotel". The hotel announced that the reservations are not being accepted anymore and that on 1 August 2018 the hotel will be closed.

However, citing the problem with 30 families of military personnel which live in the hotel, the investor postponed the works for early 2019. The families were settled in 1991-1992 when they refuged from other parts of former Yugoslavia after the war broke out. As the military administered one section of the hotel, they were settled in Bristol ever since, for a refunded fee. Though the reconstruction is postponed, the hotel remained closed.

On 28 August 2018, the resolution of the government stated that the Defense Ministry has to empty the building "from people and things", pay all the remaining bills for the utilities and hand it over to the government's Estate Directory. However, after months of conflict between the residents who refused to move in the temporary and unsuitable residences offered by the ministry, the ministry simply revoked its personnel on 1 May 2019, leaving the hotel as it is, unguarded and unattended, with some 20 residents inside. The ministry was given 134 apartments by the city of Belgrade on 9 October 2018 to solve the problem of the "Bristol" families, but instead of resettling the residents first, the military divided the apartments among its other members, not leaving enough quota for the "Bristol" settlers.

After hunger strike and negotiations with the president Aleksandar Vučić, the remaining residents were resettled on three locations in Belgrade, in the apartments which became their ownership. None of the apartments are from the list of 134 apartments allocated by the government to the ministry. The building of the hotel was then occupied by the security of "Belgrade Waterfront" company.

Gallery

References 

Hotels in Belgrade
Buildings and structures in Belgrade
Commercial buildings completed in 1912
Hotel buildings completed in 1912
Kingdom of Serbia
1912 establishments in Serbia
Art Nouveau hotels
Savski Venac